Zanthus is a remote and uninhabited outpost on the Trans-Australian Railway approximately  east of the regional city of Kalgoorlie in the Goldfields–Esperance region of Western Australia.

Transport

A depot existed at Zanthus prior to 1915 when the east to west section of the Trans Australian Railway was still not completed. Trains were arriving daily at the station in 1915 mostly carrying materials to the railhead from Kalgoorlie.

Passengers were stranded at Zanthus in 1948 when a train was delayed resulting from floodwaters causing washaways along the tracks between Zanthus and Kalgoorlie. Several passengers completed the journey to Kalgoorlie via a Goldfield Airways airplane while over 50 men worked to fix the two big washaways.

A derailment of a train occurred in 1953 when five coaches of the transcontinental eastbound express left the tracks near the town tearing up a section of the line. Repair crews worked through the night and built a deviation by the following day.

In 1975, large amounts of rain had inundated inland Western Australia from the remnants of Cyclone Trixie. A large washaway close to Zanthus had resulted in the closure of the line. A new bridge was constructed as part of the repairs in just two weeks.

Zanthus has a crossing loop on the line. On 8 August 1999, the Indian Pacific passenger train collided with a stationary steel train in the area.

The locality also has notoriety due to its position in place name lists of Western Australia.

See also 

 Localities on the Trans-Australian Railway

References

Nullarbor Plain
Goldfields-Esperance
Trans-Australian Railway